Tannu may refer to:
 Tannu-Tuva, a partially recognized socialist republic
 Tannu-Ola mountains, a mountain range in southern Siberia
 Tannu Uriankhai, a historic region of the Mongol Empire